Pietro Riminucci, also known as Serafino of Pietrarubbia, (Pietrarubbia, Pesaro e Urbino, Italy, 25 April 1875 – Macerata, Italy, 17 March 1960) was a lay brother professed in the Order of Friars Minor Capuchin. He was declared Venerable on March 15, 2008 by Pope Benedict XVI.

References

1875 births
1960 deaths
Venerated Catholics by Pope Benedict XVI
Capuchins
Italian Roman Catholic clergy
People from the Province of Pesaro and Urbino